The Mid-Pacific Mountains (MPM) is a large oceanic plateau located in the central North Pacific Ocean or south of the Hawaiian–Emperor seamount chain. About 50 seamounts are distributed over the MPM. Some of the highest points in the range are above sea level which include Wake Island and Marcus Island.

The ocean floor of the MPM dates back to the Jurassic-Cretaceous, some of the oldest oceanic crust on Earth.

The MPM is a range of guyots with a lava composition similar to those found in Iceland and the Galapagos Islands, and they probably formed similarly at or near a rift system.
In the Cretaceous, they formed large tropical islands located closer to the Equator that began to sink in the late Mesozoic.

The MPM formed in the Early Cretaceous (at  110 Ma) over a hotspot that uplifted the ocean floor of the still young Pacific Plate.  Reefs developed on the subsiding islands and renewed volcanism in the Late Cretaceous helped maintain some of eastern islands but inevitably the guyots sank to their present depth.
It has been proposed that the MPM has crossed over several hotspots, and the MPM guyots are indeed older on the western MPM than the eastern part, but the guyots do not form chains that can be traced to any known hotspots. The MPM, nevertheless, must have originated over the South Pacific Superswell. Among the guyots in the Mid-Pacific Mountains are Allison Guyot, Horizon Guyot, Resolution Guyot and Darwin Guyot.

The western half of the Easter hotspot chain, a lineament that includes the Line Islands and Tuamotu archipelago, begins near the eastern part of the MPM.  The formation of the MPM thus probably occurred at the Pacific-Farallon Ridge and the Easter hotspot, or where the Easter Microplate is now located.

Sources

Citations

General and cited sources 

 
 
 
 
 
 

 
 

Plateaus of the Pacific Ocean
Geology of the Pacific Ocean
Wake Island